Obeldesivir (GS-5245, ATV006) is an isobutyl ester prodrug of GS-441524 made by Gilead Sciences that is currently in Phase III trials for the outpatient treatment of COVID-19 in high risk patients. The purpose of the isopropyl ester modification on obeldesivir is to improve the oral bioavailability of the parent nucleoside, GS-441524. Obeldesivir is hydrolyzed to its parent nucleoside, GS-441524, which is in turn converted to remdesivir-triphosphate (GS-443902) by a nucleoside kinase, adenylate kinase and nucleotide diphosphate kinase.

GS-443902 is a bioactive ATP analogue with broad-spectrum antiviral activity  and is the same compound formed by remdesivir, though by a different enzymatic pathway. Unlike remdesivir, which is metabolized by enzymes that are highly expressed in the liver, GS-441524 released by obeldesivir is metabolized by enzymes that are evenly expressed throughout the body. Due to their different metabolic pathways, obeldesivir can be administered orally, whereas remdesivir must be administered intravenously for COVID-19 treatment.

The pharmacokinetic properties of obeldesivir and improved was first published by Chinese researchers in May 2022. The Chinese group pursued investigation of obeldesivir independently from Gilead Sciences. Compared to IV administered GS-441524 in rats at 5 mg/kg, orally administered obeldesivir at 25 mg/kg (referred to as "ATV006") yielded approximately 22% bioavailability. Treatment with obdeldesivir reduced viral load and prevents lung pathology in KI-hACE2 and Ad5-hACE2 mouse models of SARS-CoV-2. A patent filed by Gilead Sciences  with a priority date of August 27, 2020, found the bioavailability of GS-441524 after oral administration of obdeldesivir (compound 15) in mice, rats, ferrets, dogs, and cynomolgus macaques to be 41%, 63.9%, 154%, 94%, and 38%, respectively. Across all species evaluated, obeldesivir showed improved oral bioavailability compared to oral administration of the parent nucleoside, GS-441524.

References 

Anti–RNA virus drugs
Heterocyclic compounds with 2 rings
Nitrogen heterocycles
Triazines
Nitriles
Tetrahydrofurans